The Craig plot, named after Paul N. Craig, is a plot of two substituent parameters (e.g. Hansch-Fujita π constant and sigma constant) used in rational drug design.

Two most used forms of a Craig plot are
 plotting the sigma constants of the Hammett equation versus hydrophobicity
 plotting the steric terms of the Taft equation against hydrophobicity

See also
 Quantitative structure-activity relationship
 pKa

References

Further reading
 

Medicinal chemistry